William Edward Gumbleton (2 March 1840 – 4 April 1911) was an eminent Irish horticulturist with at least one species (Arctotis gumbletonii) and two cultivars named after him.

He was the elder of the two sons of Rev. George Gumbleton, an Anglican clergyman, and Frances Anne (née Penrose). The Gumbleton family had lived in Ireland for several generations and Rev. George Gumbleton was vicar of Affane, County Cork. William Edward Gumbleton was educated at Brasenose College, Oxford, where he matriculated 8 June 1858, but seems to have left the university before graduating, as there is no record of his being awarded a degree.

As a young man, he travelled in Europe with his mother and studied languages, art and music, before settling at Belgrove, County Cork, an estate owned by his family and situated on Great Island in Cork Harbour. There, he devoted himself to horticulture, specialising in the growing of rare and newly introduced plants, particularly the species and cultivars of the Compositae such as Dahlia, Gnaphalium, Arctotis and Olearia.

Gumbleton was highly opinionated and quite intolerant of other people and of plants which he considered 'inferior'. There are examples of cases where, during visits to other people's gardens, he destroyed inferior specimens of plants, sometimes with his umbrella.

The species Arctotis gumbletonii was named after him by J.D. Hooker, "in tardy recognition of Mr. Gumbleton's services  as a raiser and flowerer of many fine new plants". He also had two cultivars named after him: Kniphofia 'W.E. Gumbleton' and Azalea'''W.E. Gumbleton'.

He built up a comprehensive collection of botanical books which he bequeathed to the Irish National Botanic Gardens, Glasnevin.

References

 Joseph Foster, Alumni Oxonienses 1715-1886 B.D. Morley & E.C.Nelson, Irish Horticulturists, II — William Edward Gumbleton (1840-1911), Connoisseur and Bibliophile, Garden History, Vol. 7, No. 3 (Winter, 1979), pp. 53–65.
Ray Desmond, Desmond Desmond, Dictionary of British and Irish Botanists and Horticulturists'', Taylor & Francis, 1994. 

                   

1840 births
1911 deaths
20th-century Irish botanists
19th-century Irish botanists
Irish gardeners
Alumni of Brasenose College, Oxford